Nasiru Moro (born 24 September 1996) is a professional Ghanaian footballer who plays for Swedish club Örebro.

Club career

HNK Gorica
Nasiru Moro went on loan to HNK Gorica on 31 August 2018. On 21 October 2018, he made his professional debut in the Croatian First Football League against Slaven Belupo. He later completed a permanent transfer to the club, signing a three-year deal until 2022.

Örebro SK
On 27 July 2021, Moro signed for Allsvenskan club Örebro on a two and a half year deal, until the end of the 2023 season.

References

External links
 
 

1996 births
Footballers from Accra
Living people
Ghanaian footballers
Association football defenders
HNK Gorica players
NK Sesvete players
Örebro SK players
Croatian Football League players
First Football League (Croatia) players
Allsvenskan players
Superettan players
Ghanaian expatriate footballers
Expatriate footballers in Croatia
Ghanaian expatriate sportspeople in Croatia
Expatriate footballers in Sweden
Ghanaian expatriate sportspeople in Sweden